Robert L. Wheeler (June 21, 1920 – April 12, 1992) was American Hall of Fame trainer of Thoroughbred racehorses.

Among his successful runners, Wheeler conditioned the 1959 American Champion Three-Year-Old Filly,  Silver Spoon as well as Track Robbery who was voted the 1982 American Champion Older Female Horse.

Robert Wheeler trained professionally from 1938 through to his death at age 71 in 1992.

Family
A native of Crawford, Nebraska, he was raised by his parents, James C. and Anna Wheeler. He has 4 brothers and 4 sisters, Jack, Bill, Jim, Jerry, Rita, Pat, Jean and Joanne.

References

1920 births
1992 deaths
American horse trainers
United States Thoroughbred Racing Hall of Fame inductees
People from Crawford, Nebraska
Sportspeople from Nebraska